The men's road race cycling event at the 2019 European Games in Minsk took place on 23 June.

Results

References

Men's road race